Ba Sao is a township of Kim Bảng District, Hà Nam Province, Vietnam.

References

Populated places in Hà Nam province
Townships in Vietnam